Bassetts is an unincorporated community in Sierra County, California, United States. Bassetts is located along California State Highway 49 and the North Yuba River. The community was previously known as Hancock House and Howard Ranch; it was given its current name in the 1870s after Jacob and Mary Bassett.

References

Unincorporated communities in California
Unincorporated communities in Sierra County, California